In Greek mythology, Opis (Ancient Greek: Ὦπις or Ὦπιν means 'sighting') or Upis (Οὖπις) may refer to the following characters:

Feminine

 Opis or Ops, another name for Rhea.
 Opis, one of the 50 Nereides, marine-nymph daughters of the 'Old Man of the Sea' Nereus and the Oceanid Doris. She was one of the nymphs in the train of Cyrene.
 Opis, Oupis or Upis, a Hyperborean nymph, daughter of the North Wind Boreas. Together with Arge, she carried an offering which had been vowed for the birth of Apollo and Artemis, to Eileithyia, at Delos. Later on, Opis with her sisters Hecaerge (Arge) and Loxo, they became the handmaidens of the goddess. Orion tried to rape her but the giant was shot by Artemis. In later myths, Opis was called by the goddess Diana (Artemis) to avenge the death of the Amazon-like female warrior Camilla. Diana gave Opis magical weapons for revenge on Camilla's killer, the Etruscan Arruns. Opis saw and lamented Camilla's death, and slayed Arruns with an arrow in revenge as directed by Diana.
Upis, the name of a mythical being said to have reared Artemis. She may be the same to above nymph.
 Opis or Ops, mother by Evaemon of Eurypylus, one of the Achaean Leaders.

Masculine

 Upis or Upisis, father of the "third" Artemis by Glauce.

Surname

 Oupis or Upis, a surname of Artemis, as the goddess assisting women in childbirth.
 Upis, a surname of Nemesis at Rhamnous, in the remote northernmost deme of Attica.

Notes

References 

 Apollodorus, The Library with an English Translation by Sir James George Frazer, F.B.A., F.R.S. in 2 Volumes, Cambridge, MA, Harvard University Press; London, William Heinemann Ltd. 1921. ISBN 0-674-99135-4. Online version at the Perseus Digital Library. Greek text available from the same website.
 Callimachus, Callimachus and Lycophron with an English translation by A. W. Mair ; Aratus, with an English translation by G. R. Mair, London: W. Heinemann, New York: G. P. Putnam 1921. Internet Archive
 Callimachus, Works. A.W. Mair. London: William Heinemann; New York: G.P. Putnam's Sons. 1921. Greek text available at the Perseus Digital Library.
 Gaius Julius Hyginus, Fabulae from The Myths of Hyginus translated and edited by Mary Grant. University of Kansas Publications in Humanistic Studies. Online version at the Topos Text Project.
 Herodotus, The Histories with an English translation by A. D. Godley. Cambridge. Harvard University Press. 1920. . Online version at the Topos Text Project. Greek text available at Perseus Digital Library.
 Marcus Tullius Cicero, Nature of the Gods from the Treatises of M.T. Cicero translated by Charles Duke Yonge (1812-1891), Bohn edition of 1878. Online version at the Topos Text Project.
 Marcus Tullius Cicero, De Natura Deorum. O. Plasberg. Leipzig. Teubner. 1917.  Latin text available at the Perseus Digital Library.
 Nonnus of Panopolis, Dionysiaca translated by William Henry Denham Rouse (1863-1950), from the Loeb Classical Library, Cambridge, MA, Harvard University Press, 1940.  Online version at the Topos Text Project.
 Nonnus of Panopolis, Dionysiaca. 3 Vols. W.H.D. Rouse. Cambridge, MA., Harvard University Press; London, William Heinemann, Ltd. 1940–1942. Greek text available at the Perseus Digital Library.
 Pausanias, Description of Greece with an English Translation by W.H.S. Jones, Litt.D., and H.A. Ormerod, M.A., in 4 Volumes. Cambridge, MA, Harvard University Press; London, William Heinemann Ltd. 1918. . Online version at the Perseus Digital Library
 Pausanias, Graeciae Descriptio. 3 vols. Leipzig, Teubner. 1903.  Greek text available at the Perseus Digital Library.
 Publius Vergilius Maro, Aeneid. Theodore C. Williams. trans. Boston. Houghton Mifflin Co. 1910. Online version at the Perseus Digital Library.
 Publius Vergilius Maro, Bucolics, Aeneid, and Georgics. J. B. Greenough. Boston. Ginn & Co. 1900. Latin text available at the Perseus Digital Library.
 Publius Vergilius Maro, Bucolics, Aeneid, and Georgics of Vergil. J. B. Greenough. Boston. Ginn & Co. 1900. Online version at the Perseus Digital Library.

Nereids
Aeneid
Deeds of Artemis
Retinue of Artemis